William Brown (8 October 1867 – 30 June 1954) was an Australian politician.

He was born at Nelsons Plains to farmer Samuel Brown and Elizabeth Parsons. He attended local public schools and farmed some land before moving to Sydney to join a printing partnership. He returned to Raymond Terrace in 1893 to establish the Examiner, which he owned and edited until his death. He married Agnes Partridge, with whom he had three sons. In 1907 he was elected to the New South Wales Legislative Assembly as the Liberal member for Durham. He held the seat until his defeat in 1917. Brown died at Raymond Terrace in 1954.

References

 

1867 births
1954 deaths
Nationalist Party of Australia members of the Parliament of New South Wales
Members of the New South Wales Legislative Assembly